Kenty Creek is a stream in the U.S. state of Alaska.

The name Kenty Creek was collected by United States Geological Survey officials in 1923.

References

Rivers of Alaska
Rivers of Kenai Peninsula Borough, Alaska